Franklin Beldad Camacho (born May 18, 1989) is a Chamorro mixed martial artist in the lightweight division. He was a 2010 Blue Belt Brazilian Jiu-Jitsu World champion and a 2006 Micronesian Games wrestling gold medalist. He competed in the Ultimate Fighting Championship (UFC).

Background

Camacho was born in Guam to Marcia and Francisco Muña Camacho. He was raised in  Saipan, Northern Mariana Islands, where he is still based.  He started playing golf at a young age in hopes of competing professionally one day. However, he moved his attention to mixed martial arts (MMA), to shed some weight and get in shape, after watching UFC and Pride Fighting Championships events on television. He start training in MMA when he was fifteen years old, under the supervision of Tetsuji Kato and Cuki Alvarez of Trench Tech Purebred in Saipan. He competed in his first professional fight one year later.

Mixed martial arts career

Early career 

Camacho competed mainly within and around the Pacific Rim, particularly Saipan and Guam, under promotions, such as Pacific Xtreme Combat, Rites of Passage, and Trench Warz. He maintained a 20–4 record prior to entering in the Ultimate Fighting Champion (UFC).

The Ultimate Fighter 16 
Camacho was a participant in The Ultimate Fighter: Team Carwin vs. Team Nelson in 2012, which was the sixteenth main installment of UFC-produced reality television series The Ultimate Fighter (TUF). In his entry-round match against Neil Magny, he lost via unanimous decision and was eliminated from the competition.

Ultimate Fighting Championship

Four years after his appearance in TUF 16, Camacho received an opportunity to compete in the  Ultimate Fighting Champion (UFC), replacing an injured Jonathan Meunier.  He made his debut in the match against Li Jingliang during UFC Fight Night: Holm vs. Correia on June 17, 2017. Camacho lost the fight via unanimous decision, and earned his first UFC Fight of the Night bonus award.

Camacho faced Damien Brown in a lightweight bout during UFC Fight Night: Werdum vs. Tybura on November 19, 2017. Camacho weighed in at 160 pounds during weigh-ins, making him four pounds over the lightweight upper limit of 156 pounds. The bout proceeded as a catchweight and he forfeited 30% of his purse to Brown. He won the fight via split decision. This win earned him his second Fight of the Night bonus award. Camacho took to Twitter after the match, asking UFC President Dana White to give his US$50,000 bonus prize to Brown. Camacho believed he was not eligible for the prize because he did not meet the weight requirement for the division. Camacho became one of five fighters in UFC history to earn back-to-back Fight of the Night awards to start off their UFC career.

Camacho faced Drew Dober during UFC on Fox: Jacaré vs. Brunson 2 on January 27, 2018. He lost the fight via unanimous decision. This fight earned him his third Fight of the Night bonus award in as many fights, making him one of two fighters to start their UFC careers with three consecutive Fight of the Night bonus awards.

Camacho faced Geoff Neal during  UFC 228: Woodley vs. Till on September 8, 2018. He lost the fight via knockout.

Camacho faced Nick Hein in a lightweight bout during UFC Fight Night: Gustafsson vs. Smith on June 1, 2019. He won the fight via TKO in the second round.

Camacho faced Beneil Dariush during UFC Fight Night: Maia vs. Askren on October 26, 2019. He lost the fight via submission in round one.

Camacho was billed as a short-notice replacement to face Alan Patrick on April 25, 2020. However, on April 9, Dana White announced that this event was postponed to a future date. Camacho was then scheduled to face Matt Frevola during UFC Fight Night: Blaydes vs. Volkov on June 20, 2020. However, it was revealed on June 18 that Frevola was removed from the bout after one of his cornermen tested positive for COVID-19. Instead, Camacho faced promotional newcomer Justin Jaynes at the event. At the weigh-ins on June 19, Camacho missed weight, coming in at 158 pounds, two pounds over the non-title lightweight limit of 156 pounds. The bout proceeded as a catchweight and Camacho was fined 20% of his purse. Camacho was defeated via first-round technical knockout.

Camacho was scheduled to face Brok Weaver during UFC Fight Night 177 on September 12, 2020. However Camacho was removed from the bout during the week leading up to the fight after testing positive for COVID-19. Weaver instead faced Jalin Turner.

Camacho was scheduled to face Matt Frevola on June 12, 2021 at UFC 263. However, Camacho pulled out of the fight during the week leading up to the event after he was involved in a traffic accident in Orange County, California that left him with non-life-threatening injuries to his back and neck. In turn, Frevola faced promotional newcomer Terrance McKinney instead.

Camacho faced Manuel Torres on May 14, 2022 at UFC on ESPN 36. He lost the fight via TKO in the second round.

On June 8, 2022 it was confirmed that Camacho was no longer on the UFC roster.

Personal life 

Camacho gained his moniker “The Crank” after a fight announcer introduced him by rhyming “crank” with his first name, Frank. Since then, he has opted to keep the name.

Camacho is married to Sarah Filush Camacho. They have a son named Franklin Muña Camacho Jr, another son and a girl Catalina (born 2021).

Championships and accomplishments

Mixed martial arts
First International MMA Champion Saipan

Ultimate Fighting Championship
Fight of the Night (three times) vs Li Jingliang, Damien Brown and Drew Dober
Tied (w/Yoshihiro Akiyama and Justin Gaethje for Most Consecutive Fight of the Night Awards to Begin UFC Career

Brazilian Jiu-Jitsu
2010 BJJ World Champion 
2013 European Jiu-Jitsu Championships Silver Medalist
2013 Marianas Open Absolute Champion
New York Jiu-Jitsu Championships Bronze Medalist
2014 Marianas Open Brown Belt Open Absolute Winner
Abu Dhabi Pro Trials Bronze Medallist 
European Jiu-Jitsu championship Silver Medallist
Pan American BJJ Championship Medallist 
Asia Open BJJ Championship Gold Medallist
Micronesian Games Wrestling Gold Medallist

Mixed martial arts record

|-
|Loss
|align=center|22–10
|Manuel Torres
|TKO (punches)
|UFC on ESPN: Błachowicz vs. Rakić 
| 
|align=center|1
|align=center|3:27
|Las Vegas, Nevada, United States
|
|-
|Loss
|align=center|22–9
|Justin Jaynes
|TKO (punches)
|UFC on ESPN: Blaydes vs. Volkov 
|
|align=center|1
|align=center|0:41
|Las Vegas, Nevada, United States
| 
|-
|Loss
|align=center|22–8
|Beneil Dariush
|Submission (rear-naked choke)
|UFC Fight Night: Maia vs. Askren 
|
|align=center|1
|align=center|2:02
|Kallang, Singapore
|
|-
|Win
|align=center|22–7
|Nick Hein
|TKO (punches)
|UFC Fight Night: Gustafsson vs. Smith 
|
|align=center|2
|align=center|4:56
|Stockholm, Sweden
|
|-
|Loss
|align=center|21–7
|Geoff Neal
|KO (head kick)
|UFC 228 
|
|align=center|2
|align=center|1:23
|Dallas, Texas, United States
|
|-
|Loss
|align=center|21–6
|Drew Dober
|Decision (unanimous)
|UFC on Fox: Jacaré vs. Brunson 2 
|
|align=center|3
|align=center|5:00
|Charlotte, North Carolina, United States
|
|-
| Win
| align=center| 21–5
| Damien Brown
| Decision (split)
| UFC Fight Night: Werdum vs. Tybura
| 
| align=center| 3
| align=center| 5:00
| Sydney, Australia
|
|-
| Loss
| align=center| 20–5
| Li Jingliang
| Decision (unanimous)
| UFC Fight Night: Holm vs. Correia
| 
| align=center| 3
| align=center| 5:00
| Kallang, Singapore
|
|-
| Win
| align=center| 20–4
| Gun Hwan Park
| Submission (arm-triangle choke)
| Rites of Passage 21
| 
| align=center| 2
| align=center| 2:51
| Saipan, Northern Mariana Islands
|
|-
| Win
| align=center| 19–4
| Hyun Joo Kim
| TKO (punches)
| Rites of Passage 20
| 
| align=center| 1
| align=center| 3:17
| Saipan, Northern Mariana Islands
|
|-
| Loss
| align=center| 18–4
| Han Seul Kim
| TKO (punches)
| Pacific Xtreme Combat 54
| 
| align=center| 1
| align=center| 3:17
| Mangilao, Guam
|
|-
| Win
| align=center| 18–3
| Tyrone Jones
| TKO (punches)
| Pacific Xtreme Combat 50
| 
| align=center| 2
| align=center| 2:59
| Mangilao, Guam
|
|-
| Win
| align=center| 17–3
| Kengo Ura
| KO (punch)
| Pacific Xtreme Combat 49
| 
| align=center| 1
| align=center| 0:37
| Mangilao, Guam
|
|-
| Win
| align=center| 16–3
| Yasuaki Miura
| TKO (punches)
| Rites of Passage 18
| 
| align=center| 1
| align=center| 0:34
| Saipan, Northern Mariana Islands
|
|-
| Loss
| align=center| 15–3
| Yusuke Kasuya
| Submission (rear-naked choke)
| Pacific Xtreme Combat 47
| 
| align=center| 1
| align=center| 2:06
| Mangilao, Guam
|
|-
| Win
| align=center| 15–2
| Jae Woong Kim
| Submission (arm-triangle choke)
| Trench Warz 18
| 
| align=center| 1
| align=center| 4:38
| Saipan, Northern Mariana Islands
|
|-
| Win
| align=center| 14–2
| Keita Nakamura
| Decision (unanimous)
| Pacific Xtreme Combat 42
| 
| align=center| 3
| align=center| 5:00
| Mangilao, Guam
|
|-
| Win
| align=center| 13–2
| Koshi Matsumoto
| KO (punch)
| Pacific Xtreme 38
| 
| align=center| 3
| align=center| 1:24
| Mangilao, Guam
|
|-
| Win
| align=center| 12–2
| James Jones
| KO (punch)
| UWC 6
| 
| align=center| 3
| align=center| 5:00
| Fairfax, Virginia, United States
|
|-
| Loss
| align=center| 11–2
| Caloy Baduria
| TKO (punches)
| URCC 11
| 
| align=center| 1
| align=center| 2:27
| Pasay, Philippines
|
|-
| Win
| align=center| 11–1
| Ryan Bigler
| Decision (split)
| URCC 11
| 
| align=center| 3
| align=center| 5:00
|Mangilao, Guam
|
|-
| Loss
| align=center| 10–1
| Luigi Fioravanti
| TKO (doctor stoppage)
| PX 12: Settling the Score
| 
| align=center| 1
| align=center| N/A
| Mangilao, Guam
|
|-
| Win
| align=center| 10–0
| B.J. Taisacan
| TKO (retirement)
| Trench Warz 6
| 
| align=center| 1
| align=center| 0:37
| Saipan, Northern Mariana Islands
|
|-
| Win
| align=center| 9–0
| Carlos Eduardo Santos
| TKO (punches)
| Geran Haga: Blood Wars 2
| 
| align=center| 2
| align=center| N/A
| Agana, Guam
|
|-
| Win
| align=center| 8–0
| Roy Reyes
| TKO (knees)
| Rites of Passage 2
| 
| align=center| 1
| align=center| 0:28
| Saipan, Northern Mariana Islands
|
|-
| Win
| align=center| 7–0
| John Ogo
| TKO (strikes)
| PXC 11
| 
| align=center| 1
| align=center| N/A
| Mangilao, Guam
|
|-
| Win
| align=center| 6–0
| Nathan Hanson
| KO (punch)
| Trench Warz 5
| 
| align=center| 1
| align=center| 3:45
| Saipan, Northern Mariana Islands
|
|-
| Win
| align=center| 5–0
| Fritz Rodriguez
| TKO (punches)
| URCC 9
| 
| align=center| 1
| align=center| 0:42
| Cebu, Philippines
|
|-
| Win
| align=center| 4–0
| Troy Munoz
| TKO (punches)
| Trench Warz 4
| 
| align=center| 1
| align=center| 1:32
|Saipan, Northern Mariana Islands
|
|-
| Win
| align=center| 3–0
| Robert Palacios
| TKO (punches)
| Trench Warz 3
| 
| align=center| 1
| align=center| 4:08
| Saipan, Northern Mariana Islands
|
|-
| Win
| align=center| 2–0
| Mike Camacho
| TKO (knees)
| Trench Warz 2
| 
| align=center| 1
| align=center| 1:16
| Saipan, Northern Mariana Islands
|
|-
| Win
| align=center| 1–0
| Bernie Neth
| TKO (submission to slam)
| Trench Warz 1
| 
| align=center| 1
| align=center| 0:59
|Saipan, Northern Mariana Islands
|
|-

See also
List of male mixed martial artists
Cage Fury Fighting Championships

References

External links
 
 

Living people
1988 births
Guamanian male mixed martial artists
Lightweight mixed martial artists
Mixed martial artists utilizing boxing
Mixed martial artists utilizing wrestling
Mixed martial artists utilizing Brazilian jiu-jitsu
American practitioners of Brazilian jiu-jitsu
Chamorro people
People from Hagåtña, Guam
People from Saipan
Ultimate Fighting Championship male fighters